Lower Woods Pond is a 91-acre lake in Lebanon Township, Wayne County, Pennsylvania in the United States.

Managed by the Pennsylvania Fish and Boat Commission, Lower Woods Pond is a 50-acre natural lake that was dammed, increasing its size to its current 91 acres. The lake is able to be fished by electric and non-motorized boats only and a permit is required. Some fish that can be found include Largemouth bass, Bluegill, and Walleye.

See also
List of lakes in Pennsylvania

References

External links
Plug gets pulled on Lower Woods
Biologist Reports

Bodies of water of Wayne County, Pennsylvania
Lakes of Pennsylvania